Bakladamlar is a village in the Alacakaya District of Elazığ Province in Turkey. Its population is 115 (2021). The village is populated by Kurds.

References

Villages in Alacakaya District